Schantz may refer to
 Von Schantz family
 Johan Eberhard von Schantz (1802–1880), Finnish admiral in the Imperial Russian Navy
 Schantz Islands, a coral reef on the Marshall Islands, also known as Wotho. Discovered by Johan Eberhard von Schantz on his circumnavigation of the globe on the Imperial Russian ship America.
 Barbara Schantz, a police officer and Playboy model
  (1928–1998), Swedish artist
 Peter Schantz, a Swedish researcher
  (born 1950), German philosopher

See also 
 The Schantz Organ Co(mpany).
 Schanz (spelling variation)

References 

German-language surnames